Phosphoribosyl pyrophosphate synthetase-associated protein 2 is a protein that in humans is encoded by the PRPSAP2 gene.

Function 
The enzyme phosphoribosyl pyrophosphate synthetase (PRS) catalyzes the formation of phosphoribosyl pyrophosphate which is a substrate for synthesis of purine and pyrimidine nucleotides, histidine, tryptophan and NAD. PRS exists as a complex with two catalytic subunits and two associated subunits. This gene encodes a non-catalytic associated subunit of PRS.

Model organisms

Model organisms have been used in the study of PRPSAP2 function. A conditional knockout mouse line, called Prpsap2tm1a(EUCOMM)Wtsi was generated as part of the International Knockout Mouse Consortium program — a high-throughput mutagenesis project to generate and distribute animal models of disease to interested scientists — at the Wellcome Trust Sanger Institute. Male and female animals underwent a standardized phenotypic screen to determine the effects of deletion. Twenty five tests were carried out and two phenotypes were reported. Homozygous mutant males displayed more rearing in an open field test, and mutants of both sex had decreased IgG1 levels.

References

Further reading 
 

Genes mutated in mice